In enzymology, a citrate dehydratase is an enzyme that catalyzes the chemical reaction

citrate  cis-aconitate + H2O

Hence, this enzyme has one substrate, citrate, and two products, cis-aconitate and H2O.

This enzyme belongs to the family of lyases, specifically the hydro-lyases, which cleave carbon-oxygen bonds.  The systematic name of this enzyme class is citrate hydro-lyase (cis-aconitate-forming). This enzyme is also called citrate hydro-lyase.

References 

 

EC 4.2.1
Enzymes of unknown structure